The Delta Machine Tour was a worldwide concert tour by English electronic music band Depeche Mode in support of the group's 13th studio album, Delta Machine, released 22 March 2013. Following a warm-up show in Nice, France on 4 May 2013, the tour kicked off in Tel Aviv, Israel, and continued through Europe until late July. A North American tour followed in late August, beginning in the Detroit suburb of Clarkston, Michigan and culminating in Austin, Texas in early October. The band performed at the Austin City Limits Music Festival, which in 2013 was held across two weekends for the first time. A second leg in Europe went from 3 November Abu Dhabi to 7 March 2014 Moscow. Among the dates were Dublin, Amsterdam, Oslo and Belfast, their first shows in Northern Ireland in almost 30 years.

The 25 and 27 November 2013 nights in Berlin were filmed by Anton Corbijn and recorded for the CD/DVD release Depeche Mode Live in Berlin, released 17 November 2014.

The Delta Machine Tour is the 9th highest-grossing tour of 2013.

Critical reception 
Reviews of the tour have been mixed. A review of the 7 May show in Tel Aviv was positive, citing an excited crowd and a strong performance from lead singer Dave Gahan "who held the crowd in sway the whole time with his deep baritone and slow-grind dance moves." A review of the 9 July show in Switzerland was negative, saying "Depeche Mode fans deserve something better." The show was well-attended, but the performance itself was reviewed poorly due to "mundane" backing videos, a lack of stage props and reliance on Dave Gahan, who was described as "Freddie Mercury reincarnated as a seahorse." The review rates the show 2 stars out of 4 ("average"). A review of the 27 July show in Vilnius was especially positive, starting from the very title "Crowd of Many Thousands Raged at Depeche Mode's Concert" and emphasizing the crowd's excitement during "Enjoy The Silence", "Personal Jesus", "Just Can't Get Enough", "I Feel You" and "Never Let Me Down Again". A review of the 20 September show in Dallas praised Dave's vocals, saying "Gahan's oily baritone is the firm anchor for Depeche Mode's sleek, rhythmic songs, which came across more nuanced and vibrant than might be expected in a live setting." A review of the 8 October show in Phoenix was very positive for both Dave and Martin, saying "As brilliant a job as Gahan does at making the spotlight feel wanted, the concert retained its momentum when he left the stage, allowing Gore an opportunity to be the front man."

Setlist 

Intro (Excerpt from "Welcome to My World")
 "Welcome to My World"
 "Angel"
 "Walking in My Shoes"
"In Your Room" (Zephyr Mix)
 "Precious"
 "Black Celebration"
"Behind the Wheel"
"Stripped"
 "Policy of Truth"
"World In My Eyes"
"Should Be Higher"
"In Your Room" (Zephyr Mix)
 "Should Be Higher"
"Policy of Truth"
"In Your Room" (Zephyr Mix)
 "Barrel of a Gun"
"John The Revelator"
 Song performed by Martin Gore
"Higher Love"
"Only When I Lose Myself"
"The Child Inside"
"When The Body Speaks" 
"Shake The Disease" (Acoustic)
"Judas" (Acoustic)
"Slow" (Acoustic)
"Blue Dress" (Acoustic)
 Song performed by Martin Gore
"When The Body Speaks" 
"The Child Inside"
"But Not Tonight" (Acoustic)
"Judas" (Acoustic)
"Home" (Acoustic)
"Shake The Disease" (Acoustic)
"Slow" (Acoustic)
"Blue Dress" (Acoustic)
 "Heaven"
 "Soothe My Soul"
"Behind the Wheel"
 "A Pain That I'm Used To" (Jacques Lu Cont's Remix)
"John The Revelator" 
 "A Question of Time"
"Soft Touch / Raw Nerve"
 "Secret To The End"
"In Your Room"
 "Enjoy the Silence"
 "Personal Jesus"
 "Goodbye"
 
 Song performed by Martin Gore
"Home" (Acoustic)
"Somebody"
"A Question of Lust" 
"But Not Tonight" (Acoustic)
"Condemnation" (Acoustic)
"Leave in Silence" (Acoustic)
 "Halo" (Goldfrapp Remix)
"Song performed by Martin Gore
"Condemnation" (Acoustic)
 "Just Can't Get Enough"
 "I Feel You"
 "Never Let Me Down Again"
 "Goodbye"

Shows

Musicians

Depeche Mode
Dave Gahan – lead vocals
Martin Gore – guitar, synthesizers, lead and backing vocals
Andy Fletcher – synthesizers

Additional musicians
Peter Gordeno – synthesizers, samples, bass guitar, backing vocals
Christian Eigner – drums, synthesizers

Notes

References 

Depeche Mode concert tours
2013 concert tours
2014 concert tours
Concerts at Malmö Arena
Concert tours of Europe
Concert tours of Asia
Concert tours of North America
Concert tours of France
Concert tours of the United Kingdom
Concert tours of Germany
Concert tours of Switzerland
Concert tours of Denmark
Concert tours of Russia
Concert tours of Sweden
Concert tours of Belgium
Concert tours of Spain
Concert tours of Portugal
Concert tours of Italy
Concert tours of the United States
Concert tours of Canada
Concert tours of the United Arab Emirates
Concert tours of Ireland
Concert tours of the Netherlands
Concert tours of Norway
Concert tours of Finland